Shannon County is a county in the southern portion of the U.S. state of Missouri. As of the 2020 census, the population was 7,031. Its county seat is Eminence. The county was officially organized on January 29, 1841, and was named in honor of George F. "Peg-Leg" Shannon, a member of the Lewis and Clark Expedition. It is the second-largest county by area in Missouri.

Missouri's first copper mine was opened in Shannon County in 1846 and Missouri's only manganese mine was opened here during World War II.

As of the 2000 census, Shannon County ranked 78th on the list of counties with the lowest per capita income and 46th on the list of counties with the lowest median household incomes in the United States, making it the poorest county in Missouri.

History
The Great Tri-State Tornado of March 18, 1925 appears to have begun in Moore Township; most likely as constituent tornadoes of a tornado family preceding the infamous very long tack tornado that went on to kill 695 people across southeastern Missouri, southern Illinois, and southwestern Indiana over the next several hours.

Geography

Adjacent counties
Dent County (north)
Reynolds County (east)
Carter County (southeast)
Oregon County (south)
Howell County (southwest)
Texas County (west)

Major highways
 U.S. Route 60
 Route 19
 Route 99
 Route 106

National protected areas
 Mark Twain National Forest (part)
 Ozark National Scenic Riverways (part)

Demographics

As of the census of 2000, there were 8,324 people, 3,319 households, and 2,356 families residing in the county. The population density was 3/km2 (8/mi2). There were 3,862 housing units at an average density of 1/km2 (4/mi2). The racial makeup of the county was 95.05% White, 0.17% Black or African American, 1.83% Native American, 0.05% Asian, 0.02% Pacific Islander, 0.19% from other races, and 2.69% from two or more races. Approximately 0.93% of the population were Hispanic or Latino of any race. Among the major first ancestries reported in Shannon County were 38.3% American, 13.4% Irish, 11.8% German, and 9.7% English.

There were 3,319 households, out of which 32.50% had children under the age of 18 living with them, 58.80% were married couples living together, 8.20% had a female householder with no husband present, and 29.00% were non-families. 25.80% of all households were made up of individuals, and 12.60% had someone living alone who was 65 years of age or older. The average household size was 2.49 and the average family size was 2.97.

In the county, the population was spread out, with 26.40% under the age of 18, 7.20% from 18 to 24, 26.10% from 25 to 44, 25.30% from 45 to 64, and 15.00% who were 65 years of age or older. The median age was 39 years. For every 100 females there were 95.30 males. For every 100 females age 18 and over, there were 92.60 males.

The median income for a household in the county was $24,835, and the median income for a family was $30,102. Males had a median income of $21,917 versus $16,024 for females. The per capita income for the county was $13,127. About 21.00% of families and 26.90% of the population were below the poverty line, including 35.10% of those under age 18 and 20.20% of those age 65 or over.

Religion
According to the Association of Religion Data Archives County Membership Report (2000), Shannon County is a part of the Bible Belt with evangelical Protestantism being the majority religion. The most predominant denominations among residents in Shannon County who adhere to a religion are Southern Baptists (56.22%), Methodists (12.03%), and Christian Churches & Churches of Christ (10.84%).

2020 Census

Politics

Local
The Republican Party predominantly controls politics at the local level in Shannon County. Republicans hold seven of the elected positions in the county.

State
In the Missouri House of Representatives, all of Shannon County is a part of Missouri's 143rd District and is currently represented by Jeff Pogue, (R- Salem).

In the Missouri Senate, all of Shannon County is a part of Missouri's 25th District and is currently represented by Doug Libla, (R- Poplar Bluff).

Federal

Shannon County is included in Missouri's 8th Congressional District and is currently represented by Jason T. Smith (R-Salem) in the U.S. House of Representatives. Smith won a special election on Tuesday, June 4, 2013, to finish out the remaining term of U.S. Representative Jo Ann Emerson (R-Cape Girardeau). Emerson announced her resignation a month after being reelected with over 70 percent of the vote in the district. She resigned to become CEO of the National Rural Electric Cooperative.

Political culture

At the presidential level, Shannon County was a Democratic stronghold from its founding in 1841 through 1996, voting Republican only in 1960, for Nixon over Kennedy, and in Nixon's 1972 and Reagan's 1984 landslides in this period. In 2000, George W. Bush became only the fourth Republican to carry the county, despite narrowly losing the national popular vote, and got a higher vote share than any of the three Republicans to carry the county previously. As of 2020, the county has voted Republican for six straight elections, with the Republican vote share increasing in every election save 2008, when McCain fell six points from Bush's 2004 level. 

Like most rural areas throughout Southeast Missouri, voters in Shannon County generally adhere to socially and culturally conservative principles. In 2004, Missourians voted on a constitutional amendment to define marriage as the union between a man and a woman—it overwhelmingly passed Shannon County with 85.64 percent of the vote. The initiative passed the state with 71 percent of support from voters as Missouri became the first state to ban same-sex marriage. In 2006, Missourians voted on a constitutional amendment to fund and legalize embryonic stem cell research in the state—it failed in Shannon County with 55.87 percent voting against the measure. The initiative narrowly passed the state with 51 percent of support from voters as Missouri became one of the first states in the nation to approve embryonic stem cell research. Despite Shannon County's longstanding tradition of supporting socially conservative platforms, voters in the county have a penchant for advancing populist causes like increasing the minimum wage. In 2006, Missourians voted on a proposition (Proposition B) to increase the minimum wage in the state to $6.50 an hour—it passed Shannon County with 74.62 percent of the vote. The proposition strongly passed every single county in Missouri with 75.94 percent voting in favor as the minimum wage was increased to $6.50 an hour in the state. During the same election, voters in five other states also strongly approved increases in the minimum wage.

Missouri presidential preference primary (2008)

In the 2008 presidential primary, voters in Shannon County from both political parties supported candidates who finished in second place in the state at large and nationally.

Former U.S. Senator Hillary Clinton (D-New York) received more votes, a total of 914, than any candidate from either party in Shannon County during the 2008 presidential primary.

Education
Of adults 25 years of age and older, 44.9% possesses a high school diploma or higher while 9.6% holds a bachelor's degree or higher as their highest educational attainment.

Public Schools
Birch Tree Elementary School – Birch Tree
Eminence R-I School District – Eminence
Eminence Elementary School (PK-06)
Eminence High School (07-12)
Winona R-III School District – Winona
Winona Elementary School (PK-08)
Winona High School (09-12)

Public libraries
Birch Tree City Library 
Eminence Public Library  
 Winona Public Library

Communities

Cities

Birch Tree
Eminence (county seat)
Summersville (partly in Texas County)
Winona

Census-designated place
Montier

Other unincorporated places

Akers
Alley Spring
Bartlett
Delaware
Deslet
Flatwood
Gang
Low Wassie
Midridge
Munsell
Not
Oakside
Owls Bend
Rat
Round Spring
Shannondale
Shawnee
Teresita
Timber
Venice
West Eminence

See also
National Register of Historic Places listings in Shannon County, Missouri

References

External links
 Digitized 1930 Plat Book of Scott County  from University of Missouri Division of Special Collections, Archives, and Rare Books
 A Portrait of the Ozarks Part I - Shannon County: Home from Missouri State University Libraries
 A Portrait of the Ozarks Part II - Shannon County: Hearts of the Children from Missouri State University Libraries

 
1841 establishments in Missouri
Populated places established in 1841